Cox Center may refer to:

 Cox Business Convention Center, multi-purpose arena in Tulsa, Oklahoma
 Cox Convention Center, former name of Prairie Surf Studios, multi-purpose arena in Oklahoma City, Oklahoma
 Frederick K. Cox International Law Center, research center at Case Western Reserve University School of Law
 James M. Cox Jr. Center for International Mass Communication Training and Research (Cox International Center), research center at the University of Georgia
 Verne Cox Multipurpose Recreation Center, located in Pasadena, Texas

See also
 Cox-McFerrin Center, an addition to the Reed Arena in College Station, Texas
 Cox Stadium, multi-purpose stadium in San Francisco, California
 Cox Arena, former name of Viejas Arena in San Diego, California